ASL interpreting is the translation between American Sign Language (ASL) and another language, typically English. ASL interpretation is common in professional environments where deaf people interact with the wider community, including medical, legal, educational, mental health, vocational, and other environments. Interpretation may be consecutive or simultaneous, and pairs or teams of interpreters may engage in different interpreting styles. ASL interpretation has been regulated by the Registry of Interpreters for the Deaf since 1964. Many American universities offer undergraduate programs in ASL interpretation, and some graduate programs exist for the subject.

ASL-English Interpreting 
As with all language combinations, ASL and English are two examples between which interpreting can take place.  ASL (American Sign Language) is used by the Deaf community in North America with ASL variations existing in other countries. Interpreters are required for situations when people from the Deaf community require communication access to the wider community and vice versa. Examples, where ASL-English interpreting can occur, include educational environments, legal, medical, and community-based situations, among others.  Interpreting between two different languages and cultures involves mostly the same process regardless of the language pair. It is never a simple process of finding and using word-for-word equivalents. Rather, interpreting is a complicated process that involves a number of steps in order to achieve the ultimate goal of providing a communication link between two (or more) people who do not share the same language. The one key difference between spoken language interpreting and sign language interpreting is modality.  Spoken language relies on auditory/verbal processes and sign language relies on visual/gestural.

The Role of ASL interpreters 
ASL interpreters work in a large variety of environments, including medical, legal, educational, mental health, vocational, and other environments. Interpreting is often viewed as a practice profession (other examples include law, teaching, counseling, medicine, etc.), which requires a careful judgment of interpersonal and environmental factors as well as expertise in the skills of the profession itself. The interpreter must be able to understand the concepts they are seeing and hearing, perform the mental translation, and communicate them effectively in the second language. Although the interpreter usually intends to be in the background of the conversation and not contribute beyond interpretation, overcoming differences between the languages often requires them to make judgments which might alter the flow of communication. As with any two languages, ASL and English do not have a one-to-one word correspondence, meaning interpreters cannot simply translate word-for-word. They must determine how to effectively communicate what one interlocutor means, rather than strictly what they say, to the other. This leads to interpreters making judgment calls and considering things such as linguistic barriers.

Techniques used by interpreters

Individual Interpreters

Consecutive vs Simultaneous Interpreting 
Consecutive interpreting occurs when a time gap exists between the receipt of the source language to the moment the target language is delivered.  This could be measured in seconds or even minutes. Contrast this with translation which may occur over a much longer time frame and involve much deeper processes to accurately provide meaning equivalence in the target language.  Consider the translation of religious texts where the source text may have been written hundreds of years before the target text. Simultaneous interpreting on the other hand is considered to be more real-time. Due to the auditory influence of spoken languages consecutive interpreting is often a preferred method of service provision for spoken language interpreters.  The Nuremberg trials after World War II was a significant event that changed the nature of spoken language interpreting services. Until then, simultaneous interpreting in a spoken language context was not applied but due to the complexity of the trial and the number of languages and language pairs being used, simultaneous interpreting was successfully implemented on a large and dynamic scale making it a defining moment in spoken language interpreting provision.

In ASL-English interpreting, ASL is, for the most part, silent and therefore does not readily interfere with the reception or production of the spoken language, in this case, English.  With one language consuming a different mode, space is created to allow for the reception or production of the spoken language.  However, simultaneous interpreting is not always the preferred method and careful attention needs to be applied by the practitioner to the task immediately before them.  It is often preferable to consider the simultaneous-consecutive dichotomy as a continuum in which the interpreter possesses the ability to flow between the two extremes.

Teams of interpreters 
While the following is a list of interpreting styles, teams of interpreters often are dynamic in their approach. Interpreting styles are not prescriptive; while they can be closely followed, they are also flexible and methodology may depend on the setting.

The "Hot/Cold" seat arrangement 
This interpreting arrangement involves an interpreter sitting in front of the Deaf person/ people with another interpreter facing the "working" interpreter. The second interpreter's role is to assist the "working" interpreter via the supplementation of information if needed. It is typical for interpreters in this arrangement to arrange when they will switch roles beforehand so as to ensure smooth transitions between their services.

The modified "Hot/Cold" seat arrangement 
This modified technique prompts interpreters to switch every time a different speaker speaks or signs. In a public presentation scenario, for example, one interpreter may interpret what the host of the event is saying and then switch with a partner when a guest speaker presents.

The "On/Off" seat arrangement 
In this arrangement, "working" interpreters work for as long as they have decided each shift will be per interpreter; once they have finished their allotted time, they can have "off" time. This time away from interpreting can involve leaving the room and doing private things such as texting so long as it is unobtrusive. The rationale behind this technique is that interpreters are allowed a mental and physical break in order to ensure high-quality work during their rotation.

The "Deaf-focused" arrangement 
To effectively explain this technique, imagine that interpreters have been assigned to assist a Deaf student in a college lecture setting. The "working" interpreter will communicate the topics and subject matter of the lecture whereas the second interpreter will focus more closely on the Deaf individual, working to support them as needed. An example of their role would be to locate information that a lecturer makes reference to in the student's notes as they are kept informed of the speaker's content by the "working" interpreter. In a situation with more than one Deaf student, the secondary interpreter can also work to clarify concepts and answer questions.

The "Double" arrangement 
This technique involves two interpreters sitting in front of the Deaf person/ people. This arrangement does not involve switching on and off every set amount of minutes and, instead, the interpreters are assigned to certain people or groups of people. For example, one interpreter may interpret for a lecturer, whereas the other interprets for audience members/ students.

The "Deaf-Centered" arrangement 
If the interpreters assigned to a job are not at the same level of fluency, the interpreter who is less proficient and/or less qualified will serve as the support to the primary interpreter. If the primary interpreter needs a rest, the secondary interpreter will fill in for them so as not to disrupt the Deaf person's/ audience's experience.

Interpreter education

(A Brief) History 
In many ways, the United States has been a pioneer of interpreter education and workforce organization.  The Registry of Interpreters for the Deaf (RID) was founded in 1964 for the purpose of systematizing a process for interpreter certification.  Six years later the first certification system was in place for practitioners in the field.  From these humble beginnings, federal funding began the support of educational programs throughout the country in the early 1970s.  A total of 10 regional centers and 2 national centers sprung up and continued under Department of Education funding until 2004 when the number of centers was reduced by half - 5 regional and 1 national.  The earliest cohort of interpreters were mostly people who had familial and community ties to the Deaf Community.  But by 2009 that number was less than 15%, the vast majority being those who took up the language through interest and study.

Training Programs

Skill Requirements and Curricula 
Interpreters are required to possess a wide range of skills and attributes in order to effectively perform the duties required of them.  Many 'soft' skills, such as etiquette, diplomacy, teamwork, and flexibility are complementary to the technical skills demanded by the participants in the interaction and the environment in which the interaction takes place.  Finding the right balance of growing these skills in an educational program is not an easy feat. Although programs may vary widely based on the experience of the trainers, length and level of the program, and the institute in which it resides, the following outlines the broad topics that are required:

 The interpreting process
 The translation process
 Models of the interpreting process
 Language skills and knowledge
 Bi-cultural skills and personal attributes
 Discourse strategies, register, and linguistics
 Role, ethics, and professional practice
 Communication dynamics and demands
 Interpreting settings
 Practical skills and workplace experience
 Specialized skills such as team interpreting, telephone/video remote interpreting, DeafBlind, legal and medical, among others

By no means is this an exhaustive list.  Certain programs may focus more time and instruction on some areas than other programs.  Indeed, graduate programs will endeavor to place more emphasis on research or high-order skill development compared to programs at a beginner level where students graduate with an associate degree or diploma.

Current Training Programs 
Across the United States, there are currently 50 undergraduate programs on offer.  These programs are 4 years in duration.  In addition, 82 institutes and community colleges offer a 2-year program.  While a further 6 offer graduate programs.

Code of Ethics for Interpreters 
Interpreters who use signed and spoken languages can join organizations such as the Registry of Interpreters for the Deaf (RID) to provide quality support to people who may require their services and further advance this line of work. The RID co-authored the ethical code of conduct for interpreters w/the National Association of the Deaf (NAD). This organization outlines this code of ethics for interpreters to allow them to be held accountable and create an environment of trust between them and their clients. There are 7 Tenets in their Ethical Code:

 Interpreters adhere to standards of confidential communication.
 Interpreters possess the professional skills and knowledge required for the specific interpreting situation.
 Interpreters conduct themselves in a manner appropriate to the specific interpreting situation.
 Interpreters demonstrate respect for consumers.
 Interpreters demonstrate respect for colleagues, interns, and students of the profession.
 Interpreters maintain ethical business practices.
 Interpreters engage in professional development

There are 48 states with RID Chapters and representatives in Puerto Rico and the District of Columbia, not including Delaware and Maryland

Code of Ethics for Educational Interpreters 
The National Association of Interpreters in Education (NAIE) has a Code of Ethics for ASL Interpreters that work in educational settings and translate sign language, cued language, and oral languages. These ASL interpreters are commonly referred to as "educational interpreters." There are 7 main tenets set in place in order to provide students with equal access to communication and put their interests first. These 7 tenets are:

 Interpreters respect student autonomy.
 Interpreters provide access to language and communication in the educational environment at all times.
 Interpreters maintain the confidentiality of information pertaining to their work.
 Interpreters support and participate on the educational team.
 Interpreters continually develop their knowledge, skills, and professionalism to ensure they are qualified for all aspects of their role.
 Interpreters avoid perceived or actual conflicts of interest.
 Interpreters engage in ethical professional practices.

Employment Opportunities 
The nature of the workforce has undergone dramatic changes over the past 30 years. Many ASL-English interpreters in the US are either self-employed or obtain their work from an agency. In both situations, they work on a freelance basis. This type of employment status offers flexibility, self-determination with regard to hours, and the opportunity to encounter a wide range of clients in a wide range of environments. Opportunities also exist for interpreters to work on staff for various organizations such as in educational institutes (elementary, secondary, and tertiary) or in organizations where a number of Deaf people are employed.

The COVID-19 pandemic forced many practitioners to change their working style from face-to-face/in-person to online. Although this is a recent phenomenon, providing interpreting services via an online medium with a video interface technology is not new. Companies such as Purple, Convo, and Sorenson in the US have provided video remote interpreting services for a number of years.

References

External links
 Graduate Programs – Conference of Interpreter Trainers

American Sign Language
Language interpretation
Professional titles and certifications